The Havemeyer family is a prominent New York family of German origin that owned significant sugar refining interests in the United States.

History
William Havemeyer (1770-1851) left Germany at age 15 and arrived in New York City after learning the trade of sugar refining in London. In New York he managed a sugar house on Pine Street before opening his own refinery on Vandam Street with his brother, Frederick Christian Havemeyer, who had come to New York in 1802. Together the two brothers operated the W. & F.C. Havemeyer Company sugar refineries, before passing the business on to their sons. His son William Frederick Havemeyer, retired from the sugar refining business in 1842 and entered politics, eventually serving three terms as Mayor of New York. 

In 1855, the family relocated their refineries to Brooklyn, where they remained as the business grew to acquire a commanding share of the United States sugar refining market under the leadership of Frederick's grandson, Henry Osborne Havemeyer. The Havemeyer refineries were incorporated as the American Sugar Refining Company in 1891 and became known as Domino Sugar in 1900. In the 20th century several of the family's members made notable contributions to the arts. Henry Osborne Havemeyer and his wife Louisine Havemeyer made large bequests to the Metropolitan Museum of Art and their daughter Electra Havemeyer Webb founded the Shelburne Museum.

Havemeyer Street in the Williamsburg neighborhood of Brooklyn is named after the family.

Family tree

 William Havemeyer (1770-1851) ∞ Susannah Clegg (1781-1838)
 William Frederick Havemeyer (1804-1874) ∞ Sarah Agnes Craig (1807-1894)
 John Craig Havemeyer (1832-1922)
 Charles William Havemeyer ∞ Julia Loomis 
 Loomis Havemeyer (1886-1971)
  Julia Loomis Havemeyer
 Henry Havemeyer (1838-1886) ∞ Mary Moller 
  William Moller Havemeyer (1865-1900) ∞ Clara Bloodgood 
  Hector Craig Havemeyer (1840-1889)
 Anna Margaret Havemeyer (1806-1891) ∞ Charles Burkhalter (1804-1884)
  Susan Havemeyer Burkhalter ∞ Jacob Augustus Geissenhainer (1839-1917) 
 Albert Havemeyer (1814-1874) ∞ Henrietta Sherman (1818-1880)
 Anne Amelia Havemeyer (1850 - 1934) ∞ Norris Woodruff Mundy (1845-1918)
 Norris Havemeyer Mundy (1874-1943)
 William Albert Havemeyer (1843-1903)
 Henrietta Sherman Havemeyer (1854-1928) ∞ Charles Waldo Haskins (1852-1903) 
 Noël Haskins (1896-1982) ∞ Frederic Timothy Murphy (1884-1924)
 Amelia Susanna Havemeyer (1820-1859) ∞ Augustus Theodosius Geissenhainer (1814-1882)
 Anna Margaret Geissenhainer (1847-1893) ∞ George Goelet Kip (1845-1926)
 Charles Augustus Kip (1870-1940) ∞ Marie Gilmour Bryce (1878-1940)
Elbert Samuel Kip (1874-1950) ∞ Alice Alden Bushnell (1872-1952) 
 Anna Elizabeth Kip (1880-1918) ∞ A. Paul Olmsted (1882-1948)

 Frederick Christian Havemeyer (1774-1841) ∞ Catharine Billiger (1784-1876)
 Frederick Christian Havemeyer (1807-1891) ∞ Sarah Louise Osborne Henderson (1812-1851)
 Theodore Havemeyer (1839-1897) ∞ Emily de Loosey (1844–1914)
 Charles Frederick Havemeyer (1867-1898) ∞ Camilla Woodward Moss (1869-1934)  
  Theodora Havemeyer (1878-1945) ∞ Cameron Winslow (1854-1932)
 Henry Osborne Havemeyer (1847-1907) ∞ Louisine Waldron Elder (1855-1929)
 Adaline Havemeyer (1884-1963) ∞ Peter Hood Ballantine Frelinghuysen 
  Peter Frelinghuysen Jr. (1916-2011)
  Rodney Frelinghuysen (1946- ) 
 Horace Havemeyer (1886-1956) ∞ Doris Anna Dick (1890-1982)
  Horace Havemeyer Jr. (c. 1915–1990) ∞ Rosalind Everdell (1917–2017)
 Horace Havemeyer III (1942–2014) ∞ Eugenie Cowan
 Rosalind Havemeyer ∞ Christopher du Pont Roosevelt (b. 1941; son of F.D.R. Jr.)
  Electra Havemeyer (1888–1960) ∞ James Watson Webb II (1884–1960)
  James Watson Webb, Jr. (1916–2000)
 Mary Rosina Havemeyer (1812-1885) ∞ John Isaiah Northrop
 John Isaiah Northrop (1861-1891) ∞ Alice Belle Rich (1863-1922)
 John Howard Northrop (1891-1987) ∞ Louise Walker
 Alice Havemeyer Northrop (1921-2016) ∞ Frederick Chapman Robbins (1916-2003)

See also
Vanderbilt family
Frelinghuysen family

External links 

 The Havemeyer Tiffany Collection at the University of Michigan Museum of Art
 Resource: The Havemeyer House at the University of Michigan Museum of Art

References 

 
19th century in New York City
American families of German ancestry
Business families of the United States
German-American history
History of New York City